The 1948 United States Senate elections were elections which coincided with the election of Democratic President Harry S. Truman for a full term. The 32 seats of Class 2 were contested in regular elections, and one special election was held to fill a vacancy. Truman had campaigned against an "obstructionist" Congress that had blocked many of his initiatives, and in addition the U.S. economy recovered from the postwar recession of 1946–47 by election day. Thus Truman was rewarded with a Democratic gain of nine seats in the Senate, enough to give them control of the chamber. This was the last time until 2020 that Democrats flipped a chamber of Congress in a presidential election cycle.

Results summary 

Colored shading indicates party with largest share of that row.

Source: Clerk of the U.S. House of Representatives

Gains, losses, and holds

Retirements
Five Republicans and three Democrats retired instead of seeking re-election.

Defeats
Eight Republicans and two Democrats sought re-election but lost in the primary or general election.

Change in composition

Before the elections

Election results

Race summaries

Special elections during the 80th Congress 
In these special elections, the winner was seated during 1948 or before January 3, 1949; ordered by election date.

Elections leading to the next Congress 
In these general elections, the winners were elected for the term beginning January 3, 1949; ordered by state.

All of the elections involved the Class 2 seats.

Closest races 
Six races had a margin of victory under 10%:

Wyoming is the tipping point state with a margin of 14.2%.

Alabama

Arkansas

Colorado

Delaware

Georgia

Idaho 

Democrat Bert H. Miller defeated incumbent Republican Henry Dworshak. As of 2020, this remains the last time that a Democrat would win Idaho’s Class 2 Senate seat.

Illinois

Iowa

Kansas

Kentucky

Louisiana

Louisiana (regular)

Louisiana (special)

Maine

Massachusetts

Michigan

Minnesota

Mississippi

Montana 

Incumbent United States Senator James E. Murray, who was first elected to the Senate in a special election in 1934 and was re-elected in 1936 and 1942, ran for re-election. After winning the Democratic primary, he faced Tom J. Davis, an attorney and the Republican nominee, in the general election. Following a narrow re-election in 1936, Murray significantly expanded his margin of victory and comfortably won re-election over Davis, winning his fourth term and his third full term in the Senate.

Nebraska

New Hampshire

New Jersey

New Mexico

North Carolina 

There were 2 elections to the same seat, due to the December 15, 1946 death of three-term Democrat Josiah Bailey. Democratic former congressman William B. Umstead was appointed December 18, 1946 to continue Bailey's term, pending a special election.

Umstead supported the conservative Taft–Hartley Act. The Democratic former Governor of North Carolina J. Melville Broughton was seen as a "rather liberal alternative" to Umstead. Broughton beat Umstead in the Democratic primaries and then won the general elections.

North Carolina (special)

North Carolina (regular) 

Broughton was seated December 31, 1948 to finish the current term but died March 6, 1949, just after the new term began. His death lead to another appointment (Democrat Frank Graham) in 1949 and another special election in 1950 of Democrat Willis Smith. Smith also died during the term, leading to yet another appointment (Democrat Alton A. Lennon) and 1954 special election (of Democrat W. Kerr Scott). In all, five senators held the seat during the 1949–1955 term.

Oklahoma

Oregon

Rhode Island

South Carolina 

Senator Burnet R. Maybank was opposed in the Democratic primary by U.S. Representative William Jennings Bryan Dorn and three other candidates.  Maybank obtained over 50% in the primary election on August 10 to avoid a runoff election.

Since the end of Reconstruction in 1877, the Democratic Party dominated the politics of South Carolina and its statewide candidates were never seriously challenged.  Maybank did not campaign for the general election as there was no chance of defeat.

South Dakota

Tennessee

Texas 

Incumbent Democrat W. Lee O'Daniel decided to retire rather than seek a second full term. Congressman Lyndon Johnson won the highly contested Democratic primary against former governor Coke Stevenson. Johnson went on to win the general election against Republican Jack Porter, but by a closer margin than usual for Texas Democrats.

Virginia 

Incumbent Democrat Absalom Willis Robertson defeated Republican Robert H. Woods and was re-elected to his first full term in office.

West Virginia

Wyoming

See also
 1948 United States elections
 1948 United States presidential election
 1948 United States House of Representatives elections
 80th United States Congress
 81st United States Congress

References

Further reading
 Hartley, Robert E. Battleground 1948: Truman, Stevenson, Douglas, and the Most Surprising Election in Illinois History (Southern Illinois University Press; 2013)

 
Senate elections